Maastricht Randwyck railway station is located in the suburb  in Maastricht, the Netherlands. The station is located near the MECC Conference Centre, Academic Hospital Maastricht and parts of Maastricht University.

History
The station opened on 31 May 1987 on the Liège–Maastricht railway. Between December 2006 and December 2011 Randwyck was the southernmost active railway station in the Netherlands, as the more southern Eijsden station was closed during this time.

Station layout
The station has three platforms, divided over a side platform (1) and an island platform (2 and 3).

Train services
The following train services call at this station:
 Express services:
 Arriva sneltrein S5: Maastricht Randwyck–Heerlen
 NMBS intercity 13: (Hasselt–Liers–)Liège–Visè–Maastricht
 Local services:
 Arriva stoptrein S2: Roermond–Sittard–Maastricht Randwyck
 Arriva stoptrein S4: Maastricht Randwyck–Heerlen

References

External links
NS website

Randwyck
Railway stations opened in 1987